Bohal is a village in the Bhiwani district of the Indian state of Haryana. , the village had 349 households with a population of 1,919 of whom 991 were male and 928 female. It has one temple.

References

Villages in Bhiwani district